St. Vincent de Paul Catholic Church is a historic Catholic church complex in Newport News, Virginia, United States. It was built 1916–1917 and is a -story, brick, Classical Revival style longitudinal-plan church.  It was designed by the Carl Ruehrmurd of Richmond, Virginia. The front facade features a pedimented portico with four fluted Corinthian order columns.  Associated with the church are the contributing rectory (1917), garage (1917), and prayer garden. The parish was established as a mission of the St. Mary Star of the Sea Church at Old Point Comfort in 1881. St. Alphonsus, an African American parish established in 1944, was merged with St. Vincent de Paul in 1970. This made it the first historic church in downtown Newport News to be racially integrated.

It was listed on the National Register of Historic Places in 2005.

References

External links
St. Vincent de Paul Catholic Church website

Buildings and structures in Newport News, Virginia
Churches in the Roman Catholic Diocese of Richmond
National Register of Historic Places in Newport News, Virginia
Neoclassical architecture in Virginia
Churches on the National Register of Historic Places in Virginia
Roman Catholic churches completed in 1917
20th-century Roman Catholic church buildings in the United States
Neoclassical church buildings in the United States